The name Roslyn has been used for five tropical cyclones in the Eastern Pacific Ocean.
 Tropical Storm Roslyn (1964) – caused no damage or fatalities. 
 Hurricane Roslyn (1986) – Category 4 hurricane that made landfall near Manzanillo.
 Hurricane Roslyn (1992) – Category 2 hurricane that developed in the open ocean, causing no damage or deaths.
 Tropical Storm Roslyn (2016) – never threatened land.
 Hurricane Roslyn (2022) – Category 4 hurricane which struck the Mexican state of Nayarit.

Pacific hurricane set index articles